Tayler Reid (born 2 October 1996) is a New Zealand triathlete who represented his country at the 2018 Commonwealth Games on the Gold Coast. He won a bronze medal in the mixed relay with teammates Andrea Hewitt, Nicole van der Kaay, and Ryan Sissons, and finished 11th in the men's triathlon. Reid also competes in Super League Triathlon.

Born in Gisborne, Reid was educated at Gisborne Boys' High School and Campion College, Gisborne.

References

1996 births
Living people
Sportspeople from Gisborne, New Zealand
People educated at Gisborne Boys' High School
New Zealand male triathletes
Triathletes at the 2018 Commonwealth Games
Triathletes at the 2022 Commonwealth Games
Commonwealth Games bronze medallists for New Zealand
Commonwealth Games medallists in triathlon
People educated at Campion College, Gisborne
Triathletes at the 2020 Summer Olympics
Olympic triathletes of New Zealand
20th-century New Zealand people
21st-century New Zealand people
Medallists at the 2018 Commonwealth Games